The 1999–2000 season was the 80th season in the existence of CA Osasuna and the club's sixth consecutive season in the second division of Spanish football. The season covered the period from 1 July 1999 to 30 June 2000.

Competitions

Overall record

Segunda División

League table

Results summary

Results by round

Matches

Source:

Copa del Rey

First round

Second round

Round of 16

Quarter-finals

References

CA Osasuna seasons
Osasuna